Stephen A. Forbes State Recreation Area is an Illinois state park on  in Marion County, Illinois, United States.  It was named for Stephen Alfred Forbes.

See also
Stephen Alfred Forbes

References

State parks of Illinois
Protected areas of Marion County, Illinois
Protected areas established in 1959
1959 establishments in Illinois